Bernard Pascual (born 10 April 1967) is a retired French footballer. He played as a defender. He is currently an assistant manager with Le Havre AC.

Career
Pascual began his career with AS Beauvais, before joining Le Havre AC in 1993. After five seasons with Le HAC, Pascual moved to Scottish side Dundee United, spending two years at Tannadice. Following his release in 2000, Pascual played in the 2001 Thailand beach soccer tournament with France, scoring alongside Eric Cantona's hat-trick.

References

External links
 Official website profile

Living people
1967 births
French footballers
AS Beauvais Oise players
Le Havre AC players
Dundee United F.C. players
Ligue 1 players
Ligue 2 players
Scottish Premier League players
Expatriate footballers in Scotland
French expatriate footballers
French beach soccer players
Association football defenders